, born , is a Japanese television presenter. Mino is recognized by the Guinness World Records as being the TV host with the most hours of live TV appearances in a week (22 hours, 15 seconds), as of April 2008. This breaks his earlier 2006 record of 21 hours, 42 minutes.

Career
Mino is from Setagaya in Tokyo. He graduated from Rikkyo High School and Rikkyo University. After a short stint in the conservative newspaper Sankei Shimbun, he was transferred to sister company Nippon Cultural Broadcasting in 1967, where he worked as a radio announcer reading the news, covering baseball games, and hosting the late-night program Sei! Young. The name Mino Monta originated in the opening to another NCB program he hosted, "All Japan Pop 20". He left NCB in 1979 to work at his father's company in Aichi Prefecture, but continued to read the news as a contractor for Aichi Broadcasting.

He presents the morning news show , Quiz $ Millionaire (the Japanese version of the British quiz show Who Wants to Be a Millionaire?), and the Sunday evening , among other programmes. Mino also hosted the long-running afternoon television programme  in which he dispensed lifestyle and health advice; it was discontinued in 2007.

He claims he only needs four hours of sleep every night in spite of hosting eleven TV programmes, including news shows, talk shows, wildlife shows and quiz shows, and appearing on television every day of the week except Sunday.

Family
Mino's wife,  died on 22 May 2012 of cancer, aged 65. They had been married since November 1970.

Controversies
In September 2013, Mino took a break from television news duties following the arrest on 13 September of his 31-year-old son, who was charged with stealing a man's bag on the street in Tokyo.

References

External links
 Japan’s ‘Mr. Television’, January 2009 The Japan Times interview

1944 births
Japanese announcers
Japanese game show hosts
Japanese television presenters
Japanese television personalities
Japanese television talk show hosts
Living people
People from Kanagawa Prefecture 
People from Setagaya
Rikkyo University alumni
Who Wants to Be a Millionaire?